The  president of Italy, officially president of the Italian Republic is the head of state of Italy. In that role, the president represents national unity, and guarantees that Italian politics comply with the Constitution. The president is the commander-in-chief of the Italian Armed Forces and chairs the High Council of the Judiciary. A president's term of office lasts for seven years. The incumbent president is former constitutional judge Sergio Mattarella, who was elected on 31 January 2015, and re-elected on 29 January 2022.

Qualifications for office
The framers of the Constitution of Italy intended for the president to be an elder statesman of some stature. Article 84 states that any Italian citizen who is fifty or older on election day and enjoys civil and political rights can be elected president. The article also states that the presidency is incompatible with any other office; therefore, the president-elect must resign any other position before being sworn in.

The 1948 Constitution does not put any term limit on the presidency, although until 2013 no president ever ran for a second term. On 20 April 2013, President Giorgio Napolitano agreed to run for a second term in an attempt to break the parliamentary deadlock in the 2013 presidential elections and was duly reelected the same day. However, he made it clear that he would not serve his full term and resigned in January 2015.

Election

The President of the Italian Republic is elected by an electoral college of about 1,000 members (1,009 in the 2022 election). It comprises both chambers of the Italian Parliament—the Chamber of Deputies and the Senate of the Republic—meeting in joint session, combined with 58 special electors appointed by the regional councils of the 20 regions of Italy. Three representatives come from each region (save for the Aosta Valley, which due to its small size only appoints one), so as to guarantee representation for localities and minorities. As a result of the 2020 Italian constitutional referendum, the number of lawmakers will be reduced starting in 2022, with 400 deputies and 200 elected senators, also reducing the number of electors at presidential elections going forward. The electoral college currently consists of:

 Deputies (630)
 Senators (315 elected, plus a small and variable number of senators for life)
 Regional representatives (58)

According to the Constitution, the election must be held by a secret ballot, with the senators, deputies and regional representatives all being required to vote. A two-thirds vote is required to elect on any of the first three rounds of balloting and after that a simple majority suffices. The number of rounds has often been large thanks to the secret ballot and fragmented nature of the Italian Parliament. The election is presided over by the President of the Chamber of Deputies, who calls for the public counting of the votes. The vote is held in the Palazzo Montecitorio, seat of the Chamber of Deputies, which is expanded and re-configured for the event.There is no formal personal candidacy but only proposals from groups within the electoral college or from groups of no fewer than half a million citizens, so any citizen may be voted or elected, regardless of any expressed intention to be a candidate.Members of the electoral college, mostly being part of political parties, can make public or undisclosed agreements between each other on a name to vote as candidate, but the votes during the ballot remain secret as only the candidate's name is revealed but not the voter who wrote it so it's not always clear, especially to the public, if such agreements are there and if a party or a group of voters actually comply with them during a ballot.For these reasons, during the ballots, there could be votes for public figures not related to politics (actors, singers, soccer players for example or even fictitious characters) or non feasible candidates. Those kinds of votes are not fully beyond a political strategy, considering they're secret and that the first ballots requires a larger winning majority. They may be used to express discontent about the potential actual candidates, to test or show if a candidate is willing to become President at that moment, to spoil secondary candidates in order to increase interest in main candidates for future ballots, to spoil a potential candidate of the adversary party at the first ballots or to let other parties express their more interesting candidates before a potential winning ballot.
Often a successful vote is reached when the major political parties within the chambers reached an agreement on a willing candidate before that final ballot and their members comply with such agreement during the vote.

Presidential mandate

The President of the Italian Republic assumes office after taking an oath before the Italian Parliament and delivering a presidential address.

The term of the President of the Italian Republic lasts seven years. This prevents any officeholder from being reelected by the same houses, which have a five-year mandate, also granting some freedom from excessive political ties to the appointing body. The Italian president's term may end by voluntary resignation, death while in office, permanent disability due to serious illness, or dismissal as for crimes of high treason or an attack on the Constitution.

A former president of the Republic is called President emeritus of the Republic and becomes Senator for life ex officio. In the absence of the President of the Republic, including travel abroad, presidential functions are performed by the President of the Senate.

Legal powers 
The Constitution lays out the duties and powers of the President of the Republic, to include the following:
 In foreign affairs:
 Accrediting and receiving diplomatic functionaries.
 Ratifying international treaties upon authorization of Parliament (if required according to Article 80 of the Constitution).
 Making official visits abroad, accompanied by a member of the government.
 Declaring a state of war as decided by Parliament.
 In parliamentary affairs:
 Appointing Senators for life (that may be up to five altogether).
 Calling the Chambers of Parliament into extraordinary session and dissolving them.
 Calling elections and fixing the date for the first meeting of the new Chambers.
 In legislative matters:
 Authorizing the presentation of proposed governmental bills to Parliament.
 Promulgating the laws approved by the Parliament.
 Send a bill back to the parliament (with an explanation) and asking for its reconsideration (only permitted once per bill).
 Regardig popular sovereignty.
 Calling referendums.
 In executive matters and as to official protocol.
 Appointing the Prime Minister of Italy and Cabinet ministers on the advice of the prime minister.
 Receiving the oath of the government.
 Accepting the resignation of a government.
 Promulgating government decrees. Without further approval by Parliament, these measures expire after 60 days.
 Appointing certain high state functionaries.
 Presiding over the Consiglio Supremo di Difesa (Supreme Defense Council) and commanding all the armed forces.
 Decreeing the dissolution of regional councils and the removals of presidents of regions.
 In judicial matters:
 Presiding over the Consiglio Superiore della Magistratura (Superior Judicial Council).
Appointing 5 members (one-third) of the Constitutional Court of Italy.
 Granting pardons and commutations.
 Cannot be punished for acts appertaining to his office unless guilty of high treason or violation of the Constitution. (article 90 of the italian constitution)
 It is a crime to undermine his honor or prestige. (article 278 of the italian penal code)
 Others:
 Granting honors.

In practice, the president's office is mostly—though not entirely—ceremonial.  The Constitution provides that nearly all presidential acts must be countersigned by a member of the government (either the prime minister or an individual minister) as most presidential acts are only formal and real political responsibility is upon the government. Many of the others are duties that the president is required to perform. However, pardons and commutations have been recognized as autonomous powers of the president.

Despite the seemingly ceremonial nature of the position the president's role still has important implications. The president’s ability to send a piece of legislation back to Parliament is not taken lightly by legislators, who are unlikely to ignore it unless the legislation is critical. Moreover, in times of political instability the president has significant leeway in appointing prime ministers, such as when President Scalfaro appointed Lamberto Dini as prime minister against the wishes of outgoing Prime Minister Silvio Berlusconi, or when President Napolitano appointed Mario Monti in 2011 and Enrico Letta in 2013.

This leeway extends even further to cabinet appointments, as in 2018 when President Mattarella blocked the appointment of Paolo Savona to the Ministry of Economy and Finance. Mattarella felt that Savona's Euroscepticism would endanger Italy's relationship with the EU; he took the line that as the guardian of the Constitution, he could not allow this to happen.

Succession

According to Article 86 of the Constitution, in all the cases in which the president is unable to perform the functions of the office, these shall be performed by the president of the Senate, who would temporarily serve as Acting President of Italy.

In the event of permanent incapacity, death in office or resignation of the president, the president of the Chamber of Deputies shall call an election of a new president within fifteen days, notwithstanding the longer term envisaged during the dissolution of the Parliament or in the three months preceding dissolution.

Residence

The officeholder resides in Rome at the Quirinal Palace and also has at his disposal the presidential holdings of Castelporziano, near Rome and Villa Rosebery in Naples. The residence at the Quirinal is guarded by the Corazzieri, an elite cuirassier honor guard that is part of the Carabinieri and has its historical roots in the guards of the House of Savoy.

Timeline

See also 
 List of presidents of Italy
 List of presidents of Italy by time in office
 Italian presidential elections
 Spouses and companions of the presidents of Italy
 Semestre bianco
 Presidential standard of Italy

References

External links 
 Official website (in Italian)

 
Articles which contain graphical timelines
Italian constitutional institutions
1948 establishments in Italy